The Anagram Islands are a group of small islands and rocks lying between Roca Islands and Argentine Islands, in the Wilhelm Archipelago, Antarctica. The area was charted by the Belgian Antarctic Expedition under Adrien de Gerlache, 1897–99, the French Antarctic Expedition under Jean-Baptiste Charcot, 1903–05 and 1908–10, and the British Graham Land Expedition under John Riddoch Rymill, 1934–37. The names Argentine, Roca and Cruls were variously applied to the four island groups on the south side of French Passage. The islands were mapped in detail by the Falkland Islands Dependencies Survey from photos taken from the helicopter of HMS Protector and from information obtained by the British Naval Hydrographic Survey Unit in 1958, and the three names positioned as originally given by the Belgian and French expeditions. The remaining island group was named Anagram Islands by the United Kingdom Antarctic Place-Names Committee in 1959, anagram meaning a transposition of parts.

See also 
 List of Antarctic and sub-Antarctic islands

References
 

Islands of the Wilhelm Archipelago